Cambodia is one over one hundred currently existing nations that has submitted films for the Academy Award for Best International Feature Film, with their first submission announced in 1994 to compete for the 1995 Best Foreign Language Film Oscar. Cambodia became the sixth South East Asian country to enter the competition, after the Philippines, Singapore, Thailand, Indonesia and Vietnam. To date, Cambodia has submitted ten films.

Submissions
The Academy of Motion Picture Arts and Sciences has invited the film industries of various countries to submit their best film for the Academy Award for Best Foreign Language Film since 1956. The Foreign Language Film Award Committee oversees the process and reviews all the submitted films. Following this, they vote via secret ballot to determine the five nominees for the award. Below is a list of the films that have been submitted by Cambodia for review by the Academy for the award by year and the respective Academy Awards ceremony.

Cambodia's first Oscar submission, The Rice People, is a Khmer language drama by Cambodia's leading international director Rithy Panh, about a family of women struggling to survive after the death of the family patriarch from a foot infection. The story takes place several years after the fall of the Khmer Rouge regime, and is one of the few Cambodian dramas to be released internationally. The film played in competition at the 1994 Cannes Film Festival and was released on DVD in the United States and other countries.

The Rice People screened along films from 44 other countries from around the world for the Academy Award's Foreign Film Committee but ultimately failed to win an Oscar nomination. Cambodia submitted its second film, Lost Loves, for the 85th Academy Awards.

See also
List of Academy Award winners and nominees for Best Foreign Language Film
List of Academy Award-winning foreign language films

Notes

References

External links
The Official Academy Awards Database
IMDb Academy Awards Page

Cambodia
Academy Award